IBM WebSphere ESB provided an Enterprise Service Bus. IBM has discontinued this product and it will reach end of life in 2020.

See also
IBM Integration Bus (successor of WESB)

References

ESB